The Miss Venezuela 1974 pageant was the 21st edition of the Miss Venezuela competition, held on May 30, 1974, at the Club de Sub-Oficiales in Caracas, Venezuela. The winner of the pageant was Neyla Moronta, Miss Zulia.

The pageant was broadcast by Venevisión. At the conclusion of the final night of the competition, the outgoing queen, Desirée Rolando, crowned Neyla Moronta Sangronis, from Zulia state, as the new Miss Venezuela.

Results
Miss Venezuela 1974 - Neyla Moronta (Miss Zulia)
1st runner-up - Alicia Rivas (Miss Departamento Vargas)
2nd runner-up - Marisela Carderera (Miss Distrito Federal)
3rd runner-up - Gladys García (Miss Mérida)
4th runner-up - Sikiú Hernández (Miss Yaracuy)

Special awards
 Miss Fotogénica (Miss Photogenic) - Neyla Moronta (Miss Zulia)
 Miss Simpatía (Miss Congeniality) - Sonia Fuentes (Miss Aragua)
 Miss Amistad (Miss Friendship) - Gladys García (Miss Mérida)

Delegates

 Miss Amazonas - Ramona Josefina "Monona" Pizani Orsini
 Miss Aragua - Sonia Fuentes Figueroa
 Miss Bolívar - Clara Maria Azanza
 Miss Carabobo - Ana Maria Rodríguez
 Miss Departamento Vargas - Alicia Rivas Serrano
 Miss Distrito Federal - Marisela Carderera Marturet 
 Miss Guárico - Xiomara Guerrero
 Miss Lara - Jenny Pineda Montoya
 Miss Mérida - Gladys Marlene García
 Miss Miranda  - Reneé Porras
 Miss Monagas - Mabel Morella Vargas
 Miss Nueva Esparta - Maria Elena Ramírez Padrón
 Miss Táchira - Maria Auxiliadora Colmenares
 Miss Yaracuy - Sikiú Hernández Roldán
 Miss Zulia - Neyla Moronta Sangronis

External links
Miss Venezuela official website

1974 beauty pageants
1974 in Venezuela